7th Vitranc Cup was an alpine skiing competition, held between 9–10 March 1968 in Kranjska Gora, SR Slovenia, Yugoslavia, hosting FIS International event and premiere FIS World Cup event.

Official results 
On 9 March, FIS International giant slalom event was held.

Giant slalom

Slalom 
On 10 March, the 1st ever FIS Alpine Ski World Cup event was held in the country.

References

External links
 

International sports competitions hosted by Yugoslavia
1968 in Yugoslav sport
International sports competitions hosted by Slovenia
Alpine skiing competitions
Alpine skiing in Slovenia
1968 in Slovenia